The 1998 Crawley Borough Council election took place on 7 May 1998 to elect members of Crawley Borough Council in West Sussex, England. One third of the council was up for election and the Labour Party stayed in overall control of the council.

After the election, the composition of the council was:
Labour 27
Conservative 3
Liberal Democrats 2

Election result

References

1998 English local elections
1998
1990s in West Sussex